Koshki is the name of several rural localities in Russia:
Koshki, Chuvash Republic, a village in Bolsheshatminskoye Rural Settlement of Krasnoarmeysky District of the Chuvash Republic
Koshki, Komi Republic, a village in Seregovo Selo Administrative Territory of Knyazhpogostsky District of the Komi Republic
Koshki, Republic of Tatarstan, a selo in Alkeyevsky District of the Republic of Tatarstan
Koshki, Samara Oblast, a selo in Koshkinsky District of Samara Oblast